The canton of Pays d'Olmes is an administrative division of the Ariège department, southern France. It was created at the French canton reorganisation which came into effect in March 2015. Its seat is in Lavelanet.

It consists of the following communes:
 
L'Aiguillon
Bélesta
Bénaix
Carla-de-Roquefort
Dreuilhe
Fougax-et-Barrineuf
Freychenet
Ilhat
Lavelanet
Lesparrou
Leychert
Lieurac
Montferrier
Montségur
Nalzen
Péreille
Raissac
Roquefixade
Roquefort-les-Cascades
Saint-Jean-d'Aigues-Vives
Sautel
Soula
Villeneuve-d'Olmes

References

Cantons of Ariège (department)